Lesticus floresanus is a species of ground beetle in the subfamily Pterostichinae. It was described by Straneo in 1980.

References

Lesticus
Beetles described in 1980